Qarah Hoseyni (also Romanized as Qarah Ḩoseynī) is a village in Mobarakabad Rural District, in the Central District of Qir and Karzin County, Fars Province, Iran. At the 2006 census, its population was 58, in 10 families.

References 

Populated places in Qir and Karzin County